Ivan Yagan (born 11 October 1989) is an Armenian football player who plays as a forward and is currently playing for RWDM47.

Yagan's younger brother Ben Yagan also plays professional football.

International career

International goals
Scores and results list Armenia's goal tally first.

References

External links

1989 births
Living people
Armenian footballers
Association football forwards
Armenia international footballers
Belgian footballers
Footballers from Brussels
Ethnic Armenian sportspeople
RWS Bruxelles players
K.S.C. Lokeren Oost-Vlaanderen players
R. Charleroi S.C. players
K.S.K. Heist players
K.R.C. Mechelen players
Sint-Truidense V.V. players
Cercle Brugge K.S.V. players
Lierse S.K. players
K.A.S. Eupen players
Belgian Pro League players
Challenger Pro League players
Belgian people of Armenian descent
Citizens of Armenia through descent
RWDM47 players